Zainal Rabin (born 23 February 1975) is a Malaysian footballer who played as goalkeeper.

A Malaccan born goalkeeper, has been rated as a good shot stopper but never been called up for national duty since he made his debut for his state country back in 1999. A transfer to club side Melaka TMFC made Zainal a well known goalkeeper across the nation and he spent 5 seasons with TMFC as a regular choice among 3 coaches.

He signed for Perlis FA in mid-season of 2007/08. In 2009, he transferred to Felda United FC.

He moved to MP Muar FC in 2012 to replace Sani Anuar Kamsani who has moved to Sarawak FA.

References

External links
 

Living people
Malaysian footballers
1975 births
Perlis FA players
Malacca FA players
People from Malacca
Association football goalkeepers